A phenome, similar to phenotype, is the set of all traits expressed by a cell, tissue, organ, organism, or species.

Just as the genome and proteome signify all of an organism's genes and proteins, the phenome represents the sum of its phenotypic traits. Examples of human phenotypic traits are skin color, eye color, body height, or specific personality characteristics. Although any phenotype of any organism has a basis in its genotype, phenotypic expression may be influenced by environmental influences, mutation, and genetic variation such as single nucleotide polymorphisms (SNPs), or a combination of these factors.

Phenomics is the study of the phenome and how it is determined, particularly when studied in relation to the set of all genes (genomics) or all proteins (proteomics).

Origin and usage 

The term was first used by Davis in 1949, "We here propose the name phenome for the sum total of extragenic, non-autoreproductive portions of the cell, whether cytoplasmic or nuclear.  The phenome would be the material basis of the phenotype, just as the genome is the material basis of the genotype."

Although phenome has been in use for many years, the distinction between the use of phenome and phenotype is problematic. A proposed definition for both terms as the "physical totality of all traits of an organism or of one of its subsystems" was put forth by Mahner and Kary in 1997, who argue that although scientists tend to intuitively use these and related terms in a manner that does not impede research, the terms are not well defined and usage of the terms is not consistent.

Some usages of the term suggest that the phenome of a given organism is best understood as a kind of matrix of data representing physical manifestation of phenotype. For example, discussions led by A.Varki among those who had used the term up to 2003 suggested the following definition: “The body of information describing an organism's phenotypes, under the influences of genetic and environmental factors”. Another team of researchers characterize "the human phenome [as] a multidimensional search space with several neurobiological levels, spanning the proteome, cellular systems (e.g., signaling pathways), neural systems and cognitive and behavioural phenotypes."

Plant biologists have started to explore the phenome in the study of plant physiology.

In 2009, a research team demonstrated the feasibility of identifying genotype–phenotype associations using electronic health records (EHRs) linked to DNA biobanks. They called this method phenome-wide association study (PheWAS).

See also 
 Bioinformatics
 Phenomics
 Physiome
 Physiomics
 Systems biology
 List of omics topics in biology

References

External links 
 Mouse Phenome Project at the Jackson Laboratory

Systems biology
Bioinformatics
Omics
Phenomics